Russ Martin (born February 1, 1956) is an American football coach and former player. Martin served as the head football coach at Black Hills State University in Spearfish, South Dakota from 1996 to 1999 and Colorado Mesa University in Grand Junction, Colorado from 2012 to 2019.

Head coaching record

College

References

1956 births
Living people
American football linebackers
Baylor Bears football coaches
Bethany Swedes football coaches
Black Hills State Yellow Jackets football coaches
Chadron State Eagles football players
Colorado Mesa Mavericks football coaches
Kansas Wesleyan Coyotes football coaches
Nebraska–Kearney Lopers football coaches
Southeast Missouri State Redhawks football coaches
High school football coaches in Nebraska